Mamadou Camara may refer to:
Mamadou Camara (politician) (born 1977), Malian politician
Mamadou Camara (footballer, born 1988), French defender
Mamadou Camara (footballer, born 2001), French forward
Mamadou Camara (footballer, born 2002), Senegalese midfielder for RC Lens

See also
Mamadouba Yamador Camara (born 1945), Guinean footballer
Mamadou Kamara Dékamo (born 1949), Congolese politician